Protium asperum is a species of plant in the Burseraceae family. It is found in Colombia, Costa Rica, Ecuador, Panama, Peru, and possibly Bolivia.

References

asperum
Least concern plants
Trees of Peru
Taxonomy articles created by Polbot
Taxobox binomials not recognized by IUCN